A dhun (literally "tune") is a light instrumental piece in Hindustani classical music. Although it may be played in a raga, or mode (often light ragas such as Khamaj), it is more freely interpreted and may incorporate foreign notes (vivadi).

A dhun may be based on a folk tune or a religious, bhajan-type song, or even a filmi song.

See also
Bangla Dhun
malshree dhun

External links
Article about dhun
Definition of dhun

Hindustani music
Hindustani music terminology